The 1954 North Rhine-Westphalia state election was held on 27 June 1954 to elect the 3rd Landtag of North Rhine-Westphalia. The outgoing government was a coalition of the Christian Democratic Union (CDU) and Centre Party led by Minister-President Karl Arnold.

The CDU remained the largest party and improved its result to 41.3%, a swing of 4.4 percentage points. The Social Democratic Party (SPD) also improved slightly and finished on 34.5%. The Free Democratic Party (FDP) remained steady on 11.5%, while the Centre Party fell below the 5% electoral threshold and only very narrowly retained its seats due to a quirk of the electoral law. The Communist Party (KPD) declined to 3.8% and lost representation; the League of Expellees (BHE) ran for the first time and fell short of entering the Landtag with 4.5%.

Due to concerns that the centre could fall below 5% and lose its seats, the CDU stood aside in constituency 62 (Essen Borbeck-Karnap) and endorsed the Centre candidate. Though the SPD won the constituency, the centre were able to retain their seats thanks to an amendment to the electoral law which entitled parties which won a constituency, or won at least one-third of votes in any constituency, to proportional representation regardless of their statewide vote share. The Centre candidate in constituency 62 won 33.4%, just 26 votes above the quota.

Despite the Centre retaining their seats, the outgoing government lost its majority. The CDU formed a new coalition with the FDP and Centre.

Electoral system
The Landtag was elected via mixed-member proportional representation and had a term of four years. 150 members were elected in single-member constituencies via first-past-the-post voting, and fifty then allocated using compensatory proportional representation. A single ballot was used for both. An electoral threshold of 5% of valid votes is applied to the Landtag; parties that fall below this threshold are ineligible to receive seats unless they win at least one constituency. In the 1954 election, parties which won at least one-third of votes in any constituency were also entitled to proportional representation. Overhang seats were not compensated.

Background
In the previous election held on 18 June 1950, the CDU remained the largest party with 37%, followed by the SPD on 32%. The FDP doubled its vote share to 12%, while the Centre declined to 7.5% and the KPD lost most of their support and finished with 5.5%. Alongside the election, the new state constitution was approved by a comfortable margin. The CDU chose not to renew the outgoing grand coalition and, after a brief period of minority government, formed a coalition with the centre. Minister-President Karl Arnold continued in office.

Parties

Results

External links

References

Elections in North Rhine-Westphalia
1954 elections in Germany